The Bateren Edict (Bateren Tsuihorei) was issued by Hideyoshi Toyotomi in Chikuzen Hakozaki (currently Higashi-ku, Fukuoka City, Fukuoka Prefecture) on July 24, 1587 regarding Christian missionary activities and Nanban trade. Bateren is derived from the Portuguese word padre, which means "father".

The original document can be found among the "Matsuura Family Documents" and is stored in the Matsuura Historical Museum in Hirado City, Nagasaki Prefecture. Normally, the document called "Bateren Edict" refers to the five documents dated July 24, refers to "Matsuura Family Document", but also refers to memoranda dated June 18, 1933 in the "Goshuinshi profession old class" discovered in the Jingu Library of Ise Jingu in 1933. Furthermore, since the discovery of the latter 11 "senses", various discussions have been held on the reasons for the differences from the five expulsion orders and the meaning of the two documents.

Transcriptions

First Version
The first edict was issued on the 18th day of the 6th month of the 15th year of the Tenshō era, according to the traditional Japanese calendar, which corresponds to the date July 24, 1587 in the Gregorian calendar.

Translation
 Being a Christian should be at the discretion of the person.
 It is unreasonable for the daimyo to force its people to become a Christian even though the temples and peasants in the territory are not willing to do so.
 It is only temporary that the daimyo orders to rule the country, so even if the daimyo changes, the peasant does not change, so it is possible for the daimyo to rule the country wrong. if the daimyo says something wrong, he can do what he wants.
 A daimyo with more than 3,000 Kan and 200 towns can become a Christian with the permission of Hideyoshi.
 Those (daimyo) who have less may be up to the person's wishes, like Hassyu-Kussyu (number of buddhism sects), since it is religious matter 
 have heard that Ikko-shu may show more than Ikko-shu for Christians, but Ikko-shu not only does not pay the annual tribute to the daimyo by setting up a temple territory (Jinaicho) in the country, but also tries to make whole Kaga province Ikko-shu. Togashi, the daimyo, was banished and ordered to be ruled by a priest of the Ikko sect. It's a fact that can't be hidden anymore.
 The monks of Honganji temple are allowed to set up a temple in the land of Tenma (= Tenma Honganji), but this kind of temple territory (of the Ikko sect) has never been allowed.
 It is not possible for a daimyo with a national county or territory to make his vassals Christians than for a sect of Honganji to set up a temple territory. Those who do not understand can be punished.
 It does not matter that a person with a lower status (rather than a daimyo, etc.) becomes a Christian at will, as in the case of the eight sects and nine sects.
 It is unreasonable to sell Japanese to China, Nanban, and the Korean Peninsula. Therefore, in Japan, the buying and selling of people is prohibited.
 Buying and selling cows and horses, and killing and eating them are also a shame.

However, Hideyoshi says that he will punish those who take this opportunity to harm the missionaries. Although compulsory conversion to Christianity is prohibited, the people are free to believe in Christianity on their own initiative, and the daimyo can become a believer with the permission of Hideyoshi. In fact, it guaranteed freedom of religion. Immediately after this, Hideyoshi took Nagasaki from the Jesuits and made it a tenryo.

Second Version 
The second version of the edict was issued the next day, on the 6th month, 19th day of the year Tenshō-15, which corresponds to July 25, 1587.

Translation
 Even though Japan is a country protected by its own gods, it is completely unreasonable to introduce the evil law from the Christian country.
 I have never heard that local people are brought closer to the (Christian) teachings, made (Christian) believers, and destroyed the temples and shrines. It is only temporary that (Hideyoshi) has the daimyo of each country rule the territory. You should obey the law from the Tenka(Hodeyoshi's rule) and do various things as its rule but it is unreasonable not to do it with a sloppy attitude.
 Christian missionaries, by their wisdom, thought that they would leave it to the free will of the people to make them believers, but as I wrote earlier, they violated Japanese Buddhist law. It is not possible to have a Christian missionary in Japan, so get ready in 20 days from today and return to the Christian country. It would be a shame if anyone insisted that he was not  a Christian missionary even he is.
 Since the trade ship is coming to do business, it is different from this (Edict), so continue to do business in the future too.
 From now on, it is permitted to visit Japan from the Christian country at any time, even if you're not a merchant, as long as it doesn't interfere with Buddhist law, so I'll allow it.。
6th month, 19th day, Tenshō era, 15th year

References 

Christianity in Japan